Shri Krisha Temple is a Hindu temple located in the Sadiqabad Tehsil in the Rahim Yar Khan District in the Punjab province of Pakistan. The temple is famous for the Krishna Janmastami celebration which is participated by Hindus from Sindh and Southern Punjab. The Janmastami festival lasts for 2-3 days and a big mela is conducted.  In 2017, the Punjab government released money for the renovation of the temple.

See also
 Krishna Temple, Rawalpindi
 Ramapir Temple Tando Allahyar
 Umarkot Shiv Mandir
 Hinglaj Mata mandir
 Baba Ram Thaman Shrine

References

Hindu temples in Pakistan
Krishna temples
Hindu temples in Punjab, Pakistan